Denisia stroemella is a moth of the family Oecophoridae. It was described by Johan Christian Fabricius in 1779. It is found in northern and central Europe.

The wingspan is 8–15 mm. Adults are on wing from June to August.

References

 "Denisia stroemella (Fabricius, 1779)". Insecta.pro. Retrieved March 13, 2018.

Moths described in 1779
Oecophoridae
Moths of Europe